Carl Spohn Langton (1920-2003) was an Australian rugby league footballer who played in the 1940s and 1950s.  He played in the New South Wales premiership competition for two different Sydney clubs and was later a top-grade referee.

Playing career
Langton played rugby league for North Sydney for four seasons: 1942, 1944, 1946–1947. He then joined the St George Dragons for two seasons between 1949 and 1950. He won a premiership with St George, playing second-row in the 1949 Grand Final when his side beat South Sydney Rabbitohs 19–12.

He retired from Sydney football at the end of the 1950 NSWRFL season. He later became a first grade referee.

Langton died on 10 December 2003 aged 83.

References

St. George Dragons players
North Sydney Bears players
Australian rugby league players
1920 births
2003 deaths
Rugby league second-rows
Rugby league players from Sydney
Australian rugby league referees